Wang Zhidan (born 19 December 1970) is a Chinese basketball player. He competed in the men's tournament at the 1992 Summer Olympics.

References

External links
 

1970 births
Living people
Chinese men's basketball players
1990 FIBA World Championship players
Olympic basketball players of China
Basketball players at the 1992 Summer Olympics
Place of birth missing (living people)
Asian Games medalists in basketball
Asian Games gold medalists for China
Basketball players at the 1990 Asian Games
Basketball players at the 1994 Asian Games
Medalists at the 1990 Asian Games
Medalists at the 1994 Asian Games